Ersfjordbotn is a village in Tromsø Municipality in Troms og Finnmark county, Norway. The village is located on an isthmus between the Ersfjorden  and the Kaldfjorden on the island of Kvaløya. The villages of Kjosen and Kvaløysletta are located just to the east of Ersfjordbotn.

Ersfjordbotn is slowly moving from a traditional rural settlement to a suburb of Tromsø, and most people work in Tromsø, half an hour's drive away.

Media gallery

References

Tromsø
Villages in Troms